Lucius Valerius Septimius Bassus (c. 328 - aft. 379 or 383) was a Roman politician.

Life
He was the son of Valerius Maximus and first wife Septimia Bassa.

He was praefectus urbi Romae under the emperors Gratian, Valentinian II and Theodosius I, between 379 (the year of Thedosius's ascension) and 383 (the year of Gratian's death).

He possibly married Adelphia, as their son's nomina and cognomen suggest, daughter of Clodius Celsinus Adelphius and wife Faltonia Betitia Proba, and had a son named Valerius Adelphius Bassus (fl. 383 and 392), vir consularis and consul. Venet. in 383 and in 392, in turn the father of Valerius Adelphius and the paternal grandfather of Adelphia, wife of Anicius Probus (fl. 424-459), son of Anicius Hermogenianus Olybrius and wife and cousin Anicia Juliana, praetor in 424 and vir illustris in 459, the parents of emperor Anicius Olybrius and another Anicius Probus.

Ancestry

References
 Jones, Arnold Hugh Martin, John Robert Martindale, John Morris, The Prosopography of the Later Roman Empire, Volume 2, Cambridge University Press, 1992, pp. 723–724.

External links
 
 

320s births
Year of death unknown
Septimius Bassus, Lucius
Septimii
4th-century Romans
Urban prefects of Rome
Year of birth unknown